Shuanglong station may refer to:
Shuanglong station (Chongqing Rail Transit), a station on Line 3 of Chongqing Rail Transit.
Shuanglong station (Shenzhen Metro), a station on Line 3 of Shenzhen Metro.
Shuanglong station (Nanjing Metro), a station on Line S3 of Nanjing Metro.